Stéphane Cassard (born 11 November 1972) is a French former professional footballer who played as a goalkeeper for Sochaux, Le Havre, Montpellier, Créteil, Troyes, RC Strasbourg Alsace and US Boulogne.

He later worked as a goalkeeping coach at Marseille.

Honours
Montpellier
UEFA Intertoto Cup: 1999

Strasbourg
Coupe de la Ligue: 2005

References

1972 births
Living people
Sportspeople from Montbéliard
French footballers
Footballers from Bourgogne-Franche-Comté
France under-21 international footballers
Association football goalkeepers
Ligue 1 players
Ligue 2 players
FC Sochaux-Montbéliard players
Le Havre AC players
Montpellier HSC players
US Créteil-Lusitanos players
ES Troyes AC players
RC Strasbourg Alsace players
US Boulogne players
Olympique de Marseille non-playing staff